Darwin's fox or Darwin's zorro (Lycalopex fulvipes) is an endangered canid from the genus Lycalopex. It is also known as the zorro chilote or zorro de Darwin in Spanish and lives on Nahuelbuta National Park, the Cordillera de Oncol, Cordillera Pelada in mainland Chile and Chiloé Island. Darwin's fox displays no key differences between male and female other than the fact that the male has a broader muzzle. Males display no territorial behavior and aren't aggressive towards other males roaming around their territory.

Darwin's fox was first collected from San Pedro Island off the coast of Chile by the naturalist Charles Darwin in 1834. It was long held that Darwin's fox was a subspecies of the South American gray fox (L. griseus); however, the discovery of a small population of Darwin's fox on the mainland in Nahuelbuta National Park in 1990 and subsequent genetic analysis has clarified the fox's status as a unique species. In 2012 and 2013 the presence of the Darwin's fox at Oncol Park, Alerce Costero National Park and the Valdivian Coastal Reserve was confirmed through camera trapping.

Taxonomy and evolution

Lycalopex is a South American genus of canine distantly related to wolves and is technically not a fox. When Charles Darwin collected a specimen from San Pedro Island in Chiloé Archipelago in December 1834 during the Beagle survey expedition, he observed that this "fox (of Chiloe, a rare animal) sat on the point & was so absorbed in watching [survey work], that he allowed me to walk behind him & actually kill him with my geological hammer". In the 1839 publication of his Journal and Remarks, Darwin said "This fox, more curious or more scientific, but less wise, than the generality of his brethren, is now mounted in the museum of the Zoological Society." He said it was "an undescribed species", indicating that it was distinct from the species (L. culpaeus and L. griseus) that occur on the mainland. Later, Darwin's fox was classified as a subspecies (Lycalopex griseus fulvipes) of the latter.

Darwin's fox does not interbreed with the other Lycalopex species, only lives in forests, and is smaller and darker-colored than the other species. In 1990 a small population of Darwin's fox was found on the mainland in the forested Nahuelbuta National Park, indicating that the fox was not endemic to the island. According to Yahnke et al., in their 1996 article published in the Journal of the Society for Conservation Biology, analysis of mitochondrial DNA of Darwin's fox and the gray fox showed two patterns, indicating Darwin's fox was a new species, closely related to the Sechuran fox. Also according to Yahnke (1995; et al.1996) the present restricted range is a relic of a much wider former range. Zoologists noted the distinctiveness in the ecological niche, appearance, and behavior of this species. Darwin's fox is differentiated from the gray fox in being darker; having shorter legs; a broader, shorter skull; smaller auditory bullae; a more robust dentition; and a different jaw shape and style of premolar occlusion.

In the late Pleistocene, Chiloé Island was connected to mainland Chile by a land bridge. The land bridge was severed about 15,000 years ago when the sea level rose following the last glaciation. This created two isolated populations of Darwin's fox.

Diet
Darwin's fox has a vast diet. In dense forests, where it exists, the foxes hunt for mammals, reptiles, beetles, and invertebrates. Sometimes it selects fruits, berries, and seeds. Birds and amphibians to a lesser degree are also consumed. It sometimes eats carrion, but it mostly eats live animals and fruit. This makes it mostly an omnivore, sometimes a scavenger.

Ecology
Darwin's fox is generally believed to be a forest obligate species found only in southern temperate rainforests. They only occur in areas of primary forest on Chiloé and on the mainland. They are most active at twilight and before sunrise. In contrast to other Lycalopex species, Darwin's fox prefers open spaces. The population of Chiloé has about 200 individuals, and Nahuelbuta on the mainland contains about 50 individuals. The total population size is about 250 mature individuals with at least 90% of the population occurring in one subspopulation (Chiloé Island). Although the species is protected in Nahuelbuta National Park, substantial mortality sources exist when foxes move to lower, unprotected private areas in search of milder conditions during the winter. The population was considered as critically endangered because its main population occurred in one island and their habitat was declining due to human impact.

Conservation status
The species was previously classified as Critically Endangered by the IUCN, but in 2016 was downlisted to Endangered, as its area occurrences is apparently substantially larger than originally believed. Current estimates of the total population are still low, with an estimated minimum 227 individuals on the mainland and 412 on Chiloé Island. Fragmentation of forest adjacent to the national park and on the island is a concern for their conservation, and feral dogs may pose the greatest threat to their survival by spreading disease or directly attacking. Persecution by people who think that the foxes attack domestic fowls, though they pose little threat, is also a potential problem.

Diseases 
The species is often plagued by Mycoplasma haemocanis. The already endangered fox is prone to this infection because the infection's bacteria attach themselves to surface red blood cells of many mammals, and although the species is believed to be no major threat to human life it can spread to humans, dogs, cats, and other wildlife species. The bacteria also seem to spike when located close to any major habitat inhabited by humans as well as where there is a large population of wild dogs present near the species. Researchers are testing RNA subunits of RNase P gene and out of 10 foxes, nine were infected. Even though they are considered "sick", they have no external symptoms (Cabello, 2013). Studies show that many foxes risk of catching the deadly bacteria inclines as they age leaving many older foxes vulnerable. Although the disease is prevalent in this species, little to nothing is known about this disease.

References

Darwin's fox
Mammals of Chile
Mammals of Patagonia
Chiloé Archipelago
Endangered animals
Endangered biota of South America
Darwin's fox
Darwin's fox
Endemic fauna of Chile
Fauna of the Valdivian temperate rainforest